Matisons is a surname. Notable people with the surname include:

Artūrs Matisons (born 1985), Latvian cyclist
Hermanis Matisons (1894–1932), Latvian chess player